Openfiler is an operating system that provides file-based network-attached storage and block-based storage area network.  It was created by Xinit Systems, and is based on the CentOS Linux distribution.  It is free software licensed under the GNU GPLv2

History
The Openfiler codebase was started at Xinit Systems in 2001. The company created a project and donated the codebase to it in October 2003.

The first public release of Openfiler was made in May 2004.  The latest release was published in 2011.

Although there has been no formal announcement, there is no evidence that Openfiler is being actively developed since 2015. DistroWatch has listed Openfiler as discontinued.  The official website states that paid support is still available.

Criticism 
Though some users have run Openfiler for years with few problems, in a 2013 article on SpiceWorks website, the author recommended against using Openfiler, citing lack of features, lack of support and risk of data loss.

See also

TrueNAS, a FreeBSD based free and open-source NAS solution
 Unraid
 OpenMediaVault
 XigmaNAS
NetApp filer, a commercial proprietary filer
NexentaStor - Advanced enterprise-level NAS software solution (Debian/OpenSolaris-based)
NAS4Free — network-attached storage (NAS) server software.
Gluster
 Zentyal
 List of NAS manufacturers
 Comparison of iSCSI targets
 File area network
 Disk enclosure
 OpenWrt

References

Further reading

External links 

Computer storage devices
Free file transfer software
Software appliances
Network-attached storage